King Creek was the one time name for the East Humber River and a former community on Mill Road in the Township of King. Originally settled by Christopher Stokes in 1834 and known as Stoke's Hollow, later King Creek, the community grew around his grist mill and later included a flour mill, general store, shoe shop and in 1866 a Post Office. In July 1937, a plan of subdivision was registered for Humber Trails as a summer residential district nestled in the valley around King Creek west of Mill Road. After Hurricane Hazel, in the fall of 1954, the Toronto Regional Park Authority expropriated the land creating the Humber Trails Conservation area. One street named Elmpine Trails, on the south side of the King Creek, was not expropriated as the homes were on high ground with no chance of a flood damaging the houses. Several properties on Mill Road were also not expropriated for the same reason. For approximately fifteen years the Humber Trails Conservation Area was a manicured park. However a decision was made to allow the park to become a nature preserve. Today there are few signs that streets and homes and later, a manicured park had existed in the valley, except for a few walking paths and a King Creek post office structure that was assimilated into the buildings of a private residence and working farm located on either side of Mill Road. King Township, Ontario, Canada. The area is located immediately east of Nobleton. To the east is King City.

Environment
The Humber Trails Forest and Wildlife Area is a protected park in King Township. A tributary to the Humber River (Ontario), the East Humber River, formerly The King Creek passes through this park.

The King Creek Marsh is a provincially significant wetland, wholly marshes, primarily composed of submergent vegetation and narrow-leaved emergents. It rests upon a 41,800 square metre palustrine site of clay, loam and silt.

Residents vote in Ward 2 in King Township municipal elections.

In film
 An episode of The Forest Rangers, "The Dog Catcher", was shot at King Creek in 1963. Mill Road and Elmpine Trail can be seen, as well as the former concrete bridge over the creek.

References
Government of Ontario - Ministry of Natural Resources - Natural Areas Report: KING CREEK MARSH

Communities in King, Ontario